Clean Break may refer to:

Film and TV
 Clean Break (film), a 2008 American film
 Clean Break (TV series), a 2015 Irish crime TV mini-series
 "Clean Break" (New Girl), a 2015 episode of the American TV series New Girl
 "My Clean Break", a 2004 episode of the American sitcom Scrubs

Music
 "A Clean Break (Let's Work)", a song by The Talking Heads from the 1982 album The Name of This Band Is Talking Heads
 "Clean Break", a song by The Verve Pipe from the 1995 album I've Suffered a Head Injury
 "Clean Break", a song by Axium from the 2003 album Blindsided

Other uses
 A Clean Break: A New Strategy for Securing the Realm, a 1996 policy recommendation report presented to Benyamin Netanyahu, the then-Prime Minister of Israel
 Ancillary relief, the "clean break" settlement of a divorce by awarding a single capital sum, as opposed to requiring periodic payments
 Clean Break, a blog published by Toronto Star reporter/business columnist Tyler Hamilton
 Clean Break (novel), a 2005 fiction book by British children's author Jacqueline Wilson
 Clean Break (theatre company), a British feminist theatre company founded in 1979
 Clean-break Brexit, the potential withdrawal of the UK from the European Union (EU) without a withdrawal agreement